René Malo, CQ (born 7 March 1942) is a French Canadian film producer, most noted for establishing the Malofilm production and distribution studio.

Born in Joliette, Quebec, Malo produced youth-oriented shows at Expo 67. He later became a member of the first crew assigned to manage Radio-Québec.

As director Denys Arcand worked on the screenplay that became the 1986 film The Decline of the American Empire for producer Roger Frappier, Frappier saw the story as promising and lobbied Malo to co-produce, for a bigger budget. Frappier and Malo raised $1.8 million, allowing for more settings to be depicted in the film. Malo and Frappier eventually won the Genie Award for Best Motion Picture for the film. Among the other 25 films Malo produced were Sonatine (1984) and The Revolving Doors (1988).

He later led the René Malo Foundation, which in 2006 awarded a $500,000 grant to the Université du Québec à Montréal for the establishment of the Chaire René-Malo. The Chaire René-Malo, led by Professor Paul Tana, was created with a mandate to guide young filmmakers. In 2013, Malo was appointed a Knight of the National Order of Quebec.

References

External links

1942 births
Film producers from Quebec
Knights of the National Order of Quebec
Living people
People from Joliette
French Quebecers
Expo 67